The Anti-Drug Abuse Act of 1986 was a law pertaining to the War on Drugs passed by the U.S. Congress and signed into law by U.S. President Ronald Reagan. Among other things, they changed the system of federal supervised release from a rehabilitative system into a punitive system. The 1986 Act also prohibited controlled substance analogs. The bill enacted new mandatory minimum sentences for drugs, including marijuana.

History 

The appearance of crack cocaine, the June 19, 1986, death of Len Bias (University of Maryland basketball star), the morning after he signed with the NBA champion Boston Celtics, and the June 27, 1986, death of Don Rogers (Cleveland Browns, 1985 Defensive Rookie of the Year) -- both from cocaine use, encouraged U.S. Rep. Thomas P. (Tip) O'Neill Jr. (D-MA), the Speaker of the House of Representatives, to mobilize the House Democratic leadership to assemble an omnibus anti-drug bill that became the Anti-Drug Abuse Act of 1986. The congressional interest and intense news coverage created a moral panic surrounding cocaine use, which had earlier been viewed in a more benign or even positive way, that made enacting this legislation so important. In September and October 1986, the House (with a Democratic majority) and the Senate (with a Republican majority) competed over which could propose the most severe laws in advance of the pivotal midterm election.

Contents

Money Laundering Control Act 
The Money Laundering Control Act of 1986 was enacted as Title I of the Anti-Drug Abuse Act. This title criminalized money laundering for the first time in the United States. It also amended the Bank Secrecy Act, the Change in Bank Control Act, and the Right to Financial Privacy Act

Drug crimes 

Along with the Comprehensive Crime Control Act of 1984, the act substantially increased the number of drug offenses with mandatory minimum sentences.

This act mandated a minimum sentence of 5 years without parole for possession of 5 grams of crack cocaine while it mandated the same for possession of 500 grams of powder cocaine. This 100:1 disparity was reduced to 18:1, when crack was increased to 28 grams (1 ounce) by the Fair Sentencing Act of 2010.

The law also banned the operation of venues intended for use of illegal drugs, a provision known as the "Crackhouse Law". It was amended in the RAVE Act of 2003.

Spending 

The act authorized billions of dollars of spending, although substantially less was actually appropriated. Some of this was used to increase the substance abuse treatment federal block grant program, although treatment providers were disappointed at the reduced appropriations following politicians' earlier promises and authorization.

Other programs funded by the act included drug counseling and education programs, AIDS research, and international cooperation to limit drug production.

The Act also included the Drug Free Schools and Communities Act, which required colleges to establish drug abuse education and prevention programs.

Impact 

The law led to an increase in average time imprisoned for drug crimes from 22 months to 33 months.

Racial effect 

The Anti-Drug Abuse Act created a significant disparity in the sentences imposed for crimes involving powder cocaine versus crack cocaine, with the ratio of 100 to 1. For example, a drug crime involving 5 grams of crack cocaine resulted in a mandatory minimum sentence of 5 years in federal prison, while crimes involving 500 grams of powder cocaine received the same sentence. After the Anti-Drug Abuse Act, the number of black people sent to federal prison skyrocketed from approximately 50 in 100,000 adults to approximately 250 in 100,000 adults. During that same period of mass increase in black prison rates, there was almost no change in the number of white people incarcerated in federal prison.

This also led to an increased disparity in prison sentencing lengths between races: prior to the enactment of the Anti-Drug Abuse Act, black people received sentences for drug-related crimes which were 11% longer than sentences received by whites who committed the same offense; this increased to 49% in the following years. This disparity led to major racial and class imbalances, where minorities faced far harsher punishments for the use and sale of virtually the same drug as their affluent, white counterparts.

See also 
 Anti-Drug Abuse Act of 1988
 War on Drugs

Citations

References

Further reading

External links
 Anti-Drug Abuse Act of 1986 (PDF/details) as amended in the GPO Statute Compilations collection

United States federal controlled substances legislation
History of drug control
1986 in American law
99th United States Congress